Alulutho Tshakweni (born ) is a South African rugby union player for the Free State Cheetahs in the Currie Cup. His regular position is prop.

Rugby career

For the 2017 season, he moved to the Port Elizabeth-based , playing for their Under-19 team in the 2017 Under-19 Provincial Championship.

In 2018, Tshakweni was included in the South Africa Under-20 squad for the 2018 World Rugby Under 20 Championship held in France. He played off the bench in all three of South Africa's matches in Pool C of the competition, featuring in victories over Georgia and Ireland, and scored a try in their final pool match, a 29–46 defeat to the hosts. He was promoted to the starting lineup for their semifinal match against England — a 31–32 defeat that saw the team eliminated from the Cup competition — and their 3rd-place play-off match against New Zealand, helping them to a 40–30 win.

In November 2018, he returned to Port Elizabeth, where he was drafted into the ' Pro14 squad. He was named on the bench for their match against , and came on as a yellow card replacement in the 35th minute of the match to make his first class debut in a 14–31 defeat.

References

1998 births
Living people
Cheetahs (rugby union) players
Free State Cheetahs players
Rugby union players from East London, Eastern Cape
Rugby union props
South Africa Under-20 international rugby union players
South African rugby union players
Southern Kings players